James B. Andrews (January 7, 1907 – November 15, 1995) was an American football player and college basketball coach in the 1930s.

Early life
Andrews was born January 7, 1907, and grew up in Bryan, Texas. He attended high school in Bryan and at Dallas Academy before being recruited to play football for the Terrill School, the forerunner to St. Mark's School of Texas.

Football career
Between 1929 and 1932, Andrews played varsity football for the Texas College of Mines (now known as the University of Texas, El Paso). A 1929 article from the El Paso Times described a homecoming victory: "As for Andrews, this fellow who disdained to wear a headgear in the first half was in almost every play. He broke up play after play behind the Aggie line and hurried many Aggies for losses."

In 1934, Andrews played quarterback, tailback, and linebacker for the St. Louis Gunners of the National Football League. For three years (1936-38), he played for the Louisville Tanks. In 1937, he also worked as an assistant coach for the Louisville team.

References 

1907 births
1995 deaths
UTEP Miners men's basketball coaches
UTEP Miners football coaches
UTEP Miners football players
St. Louis Gunners players
American football defensive backs
Players of American football from Texas